Jiangchuan District is located in Yuxi, Yunnan, China.

The district is known for its Gantangjing Paleolithic sites which contains traces of the use of fire, presence of prehistoric carnivorous and rfauna.

Administrative divisions
Jiangchuan District has 1 subdistrict, 4 towns, 1 township and 1 ethnic township. 
1 subdistrict
 Dajie
4 towns

1 township
 Xiongguan
1 ethnic township
 Anhua Yi

Climate

References

External links
Jiangchuan Official Website

County-level divisions of Yuxi